Kathy Feng-Yi Su is an entomologist and evolutionary biologist from Singapore. She is an academic researcher, whose work focusses on sexual dimorphism particularly in the family Sepsidae.

Research 

Su is an expert in sexual dimorphism across species and her research in Diptera has shown how it is affected by ecological and molecular mechanisms. As an entomologist she is a leading expert in Sepsidae taxonomy. She is also interested in phylogeny, including the theoretical aspects of sequence data analysis.

Taxonomy 
Su described a new species of sepsid fly, Themira Iohmanus, discovered in from Central Park. The genera has only thirteen species, so the discovery of an additional species is highly notable, particularly because its location is in one of the most intensely populated cities in the world.

Sexual dimorphism 
Su has researched mating behaviours in several species, but her most significant work is on flies and how genetic and social processes produce sexual dimorphism.

Social Behaviour in Courtship and Genetics 
Su has studied the link between mating call and genetics in South-East Asian anuran (frog) populations and male and female courtship behaviour in jumping spiders. This research has shown that genetic links between certain courtship behaviours can be seen within in species, which has an impact on our understanding of evolution.

Sepsidae Research 
Working within international scientific programmes, Su's research into the evolution of sepsid flies, has a particular emphasis on functional change and sexual dimorphism in sepsid species. Her research has shown how abdominal appendages in sepsid flies developed and how they are influenced by histoblast nest size. How mounting position can produce sexual dimorphisms in sepsid flies. How and why genetically fly pigmentation emerged and diverged. How site specific mutations can cause produce contradictory phenotypes as a process in evolution.

Education 
Su completed her doctoral research at Aix-Marseille University, France, after completing her BA and MA at the National University of Singapore. She is Lee Kuan Yew Post-doctoral Fellow at the National University of Singapore Faculty of Biological Sciences.

Awards

References

Entomologists
Women entomologists
Singaporean biologists
Women evolutionary biologists
Living people
Year of birth missing (living people)
Singaporean expatriates in France
University of Singapore alumni
Aix-Marseille University alumni